Alicia Martinez may refer to:

 Alicia Austria-Martinez (born 1940), Filipino jurist
 Alicia Martinez (athlete), Spanish Paralympic athlete